Judgment Day is a 1998 direct-to-video science-fiction action film directed by John Terlesky and starring Mario Van Peebles, Suzy Amis and Ice-T. It was Amis' final film before her retirement and is the first CineTel film that deals with a disaster in the sci-fi genre.

Plot
Cultists with an enigmatic leader (Mario Van Peebles) seize the only man capable of devising a way to stop a giant meteor from hitting the Earth. A female agent (Suzy Amis) teams up with a prisoner (Ice-T), who together have three days to rescue the scientist (Linden Ashby) and save the planet from extinction.

Cast
 Ice-T as Matthew Reese
 Suzy Amis as FBI Agent Jeanine Tyrell
 Mario Van Peebles as Thomas Payne
 Coolio as Luther 'Lucifer'
 Linden Ashby as Dr. David Corbett
 Tommy "Tiny" Lister as Brother Clarence
 Max Gail as General Bill Meech
 Mark Deakins as Captain Doug McNally
 James Eckhouse as Colonel Tom Keller
 David Wells as Dr. Dick Secor
 Shireen Crutchfield as Rachael Payne
 Larry Poindexter as Jeff
 Craig Watkinson as Tim
 Dartanyan Edmonds as Damon
 Devika Parikh as Officer Rhonda Reese
 Myles Kilpatrick as Michael Payne
 Mandela Van Peebles as Marley Payne
 Makaylo Van Peebles as Sam Payne
 Maya Van Peebles as Trish Payne
 Jonathan Palmer as Frank Peterson
 Lisa Vitello as Teresa Miller
 Chittra Sukhu as Esperanza
 Toni Small as Lakwanda
 Kevin McDermott as Ed
 Cole S. McKay as Leo
 Chris Conner as Technician
 Richard Yniguez as Old Priest
 Thomas Rosales Jr. as Payne's Man (uncredited)
 John Terlesky as Payne's Shooter (uncredited)

References

External links
 

1990s science fiction action films
1998 direct-to-video films
1998 films
American science fiction action films
CineTel Films films
Films about impact events
1990s English-language films
Films directed by John Terlesky
1990s American films